The 2023 Moscow mayoral election will take place on 10 September 2023, on common election day. Incumbent Mayor Sergey Sobyanin has not said whether he will seek re-election to a fourth term in office.

Background

Deputy Prime Minister of Russia – chief of staff of the Government and former Governor of Tyumen Oblast Sergey Sobyanin was appointed Mayor of Moscow in October 2010, replacing acting Mayor Vladimir Resin, who has been serving as city's top executive since longtime Mayor Yury Luzhkov's firing by President Dmitry Medvedev in September 2010. Sobyanin resigned in June 2013 and appointed acting Mayor to trigger an early election in September 2013. Despite being a member of the ruling United Russia party, Sobyanin ran as an Independent and won the election with 51.37% of the vote, narrowly avoiding a runoff with a second-place finisher Aleksey Navalny (PARNAS, 27.24%). Sobyanin ran for a third term in 2018 as an Independent and overwhelmingly won the election with 70.17% of the vote.

During his administration, Sergey Sobyanin received positive remarks for resolving Moscow's transportation and social infrastructure problems, redeveloping of public spaces and bringing under control outdoor advertising and illegal construction. Moscow even hosted 2016 IIHF World Championship and 2018 FIFA World Cup. Sobyanin also spearheaded Russian efforts to combat COVID-19, leading the respective Working Group of the State Council of Russia. Sobyanin's success as Mayor prompted speculations about his potential promotion, allegedly he was a candidate for Prime Minister of Russia in early 2020, when Dmitry Medvedev resigned from the position, however, President Vladimir Putin appointed Mikhail Mishustin to lead the Government. On 10 September 2022, Moscow City Day, Putin endorsed Sobyanin for re-election, but Sobyanin has yet to publicly confirm his intention to run for another term.

Nevertheless, Sergey Sobyanin also received criticism for his infrastructure projects, most notably for mass renovation of housing stock, which was bashed for government overreach and forced relocation of citizens. Irregularities, Russian opposition claimed to be committed by Moscow's electoral authorities prior to the 2019 Moscow City Duma election, caused mass protests in the city, which were the largest political rallies in Russia since 2011–2013 protests. Subsequently, United Russia and Government of Moscow–aligned candidates won only a narrow majority in Moscow City Duma (25 of 45 seats). Aleksey Navalny's FBK also attacked Moscow's officials, bringing forward allegations of corruption against Deputy Mayors Anastasia Rakova, Pyotr Biryukov, Aleksandr Gorbenko and Natalya Sergunina.

Candidates
In Moscow candidates for Mayor can be nominated by registered political parties or by self-nomination. Candidate for Mayor of Moscow should be a Russian citizen and at least 30 years old. Candidates for Mayor should not have a foreign citizenship or residence permit. Each candidate in order to be registered is required to collect at least 6% of signatures of members and heads of municipalities (110–115 signatures). In the 2022 Moscow municipal elections neither party, besides United Russia and Sobyanin–aligned "My Raion" movement, won more than 100 seats in municipal councils, which means all mayoral candidates will need to reach agreement with United Russia in order to pass municipal filter. In addition, self-nominated candidates should collect 0.5% of signatures of Moscow residents (around 36–39,000 signatures). Also mayoral candidates present 3 candidacies to the Federation Council and election winner later appoints one of the presented candidates. In 2021 "On Common Principles of Organisation of Public Authority in the Subjects of the Russian Federation" law was enacted, which lifted term limits for Russian governors, including Mayor of Moscow.

Declared
 Dmitry Gusev (SR–ZP), Member of State Duma (2021—present)

Publicly expressed interest
 Valery Rashkin (CPRF), former Member of State Duma (1999–2022), 2000 Saratov Oblast gubernatorial candidate

Potential

CPRF 
 Yury Afonin, Member of State Duma (2007–present)
 Andrey Klychkov, Governor of Oryol Oblast (2017–present), former Member of Moscow City Duma (2009–2017)
 Vadim Kumin, Member of State Duma (2011–2016, 2020–present), 2018 mayoral candidate
 Denis Parfenov, Member of State Duma (2016–present)
 Pavel Tarasov, Member of Moscow City Duma (2019–present)
 Anastasia Udaltsova, Member of State Duma (2022–present)
 Nikolay Zubrilin, Member of Moscow City Duma (2014–present)
 Leonid Zyuganov, Member of Moscow City Duma (2014–present), grandson of Gennady Zyuganov

LDPR 
 Viktor Bout, convicted arms dealer
 Dmitry Koshlakov-Krestovsky, coordinator of LDPR city office (2022–present)
 Stanislav Naumov, Member of State Duma (2021–present)
 Yaroslav Nilov, Member of State Duma (2011–present), Chairman of the Duma Committee on Labour, Social Policy and Veterans' Affairs (2016–present)

New People 
 Sardana Avksentyeva, Member of State Duma (2021–present), former Mayor of Yakutsk (2018–2021)
 Vladislav Davankov, Deputy Chairman of the State Duma (2021—present)
 Alexander Demin, Member of State Duma (2021—present), Chairman of the Duma Committee on Small and Medium Enterprises (2021—present), 2022 Sverdlovsk Oblast gubernatorial candidate
 Oleg Leonov, Member of State Duma (2021–present)
 Aleksey Nechayev, Member of State Duma (2021–present), Leader of New People (2020–present)
 Dmitry Pevtsov, Member of State Duma (2021–present)

Yabloko 
 Sergey Mitrokhin, Member of Moscow City Duma (2005–2009, 2019–present), former Member of State Duma (1994–2003), 2013 and 2018 mayoral candidate

Independent 
 Sergey Sobyanin, incumbent Mayor of Moscow (2010–present)

Declined

SR–ZP 
 Mikhail Delyagin, Member of State Duma (2021—present)
 Sergey Kabyshev, Member of State Duma (2021–present), Chairman of the Duma Committee on Science and Higher Education (2021–present)
 Dmitry Kuznetsov, Member of State Duma (2021–present)
 Yevgeny Prilepin, Co-chairman of A Just Russia — For Truth (2021–present), writer, former Member of State Duma (2021)
 Ilya Sviridov, Member of Tagansky District Council of Deputies (2012–present), former Head of Tagansky District (2014–2021), 2018 mayoral candidate
 Mikhail Timonov, Member of Moscow City Duma (2019–present)

See also
2023 Russian regional elections

References

Moscow
Moscow
Mayoral elections in Moscow